Old White Church Cemetery, also known as Emanuel Church Cemetery, is a historic cemetery and national historic district located at Lincolnton, Lincoln County, North Carolina. It was established in 1788, and contains the marked graves of some 265 citizens of Lincolnton, with an even larger number of unmarked graves. The oldest marked grave dates to 1801. The gravestones include notable examples of 19th and early-20th century funerary art. It is the oldest burying ground in the town of Lincolnton.

It was listed on the National Register of Historic Places in 1994.

References

External links
 

Cemeteries on the National Register of Historic Places in North Carolina
Historic districts on the National Register of Historic Places in North Carolina
1801 establishments in North Carolina
Buildings and structures in Lincoln County, North Carolina
National Register of Historic Places in Lincoln County, North Carolina